The , also referred to as the  for short, is the seat of the Tokyo Metropolitan Government, which governs the special wards, cities, towns, and villages that constitute the Tokyo Metropolis.

Located in Shinjuku ward, the building was designed by architect Kenzo Tange. It consists of a complex of three structures, each taking up a city block.  The tallest of the three is Tokyo Metropolitan Main building No.1, a tower 48 stories tall that splits into two sections at the 33rd floor. The building also has three levels below ground. The design of the building was meant to resemble an integrated circuit, while also evoking the look of a Gothic cathedral. It is the tallest city hall in the world.

The other two buildings in the complex are the eight-story Tokyo Metropolitan Assembly Building (including one underground floor) and Tokyo Metropolitan Main Building No. 2, which has 37 stories including three below ground.

The two panoramic observation decks, one in each tower on floor 45 ( high), are free of charge to the public and contain gift shops and cafes. The observation decks are open between 9:30 and 23:00, but the two observation decks are open on alternate days.

History

The building was designed by Kenzo Tange and finished in December 1990 at the expense of ¥157 billion (about US$1 billion) of public money. It replaced the old city hall at Yūrakuchō, which was built in 1957 and also designed by Tange, which is now the site of the Tokyo International Forum.

See also
 
 List of tallest buildings and structures in Tokyo
 Tochōmae Station

References

External links
 
 Map showing the buildings and its neighborhood
 Tokyo Metropolitan Government Buildings
 Guide to the Tokyo Metropolitan Government Building Tour (in Japanese)
 CityMayors.com feature
 3D model of the building for use in Google Earth
 Tokyo Metropolitan Government Complex
 Wheelchair Accessibility Information

|-

1990 establishments in Japan
City and town halls in Japan
Government buildings completed in 1990
Government of Tokyo
Kenzo Tange buildings
Modernist architecture in Japan
Postmodern architecture in Japan
Skyscraper office buildings in Tokyo
Skyscrapers in Shinjuku